Irving B. Knickerbocker (June 1864 – April 19, 1954) was an American politician in the state of Washington. He served Washington State Senate from 1907 to 1911.

References

1864 births
1954 deaths
Republican Party Washington (state) state senators